Florey is a single-member electoral district for the South Australian House of Assembly. It is named after scientist Howard Florey, who was responsible for the development of penicillin. It is a  suburban electorate in Adelaide's north-east, taking in the suburbs of Ingle Farm, Modbury North, Para Vista, Pooraka, Valley View, and Walkley Heights, as well as parts of Modbury and Northfield.

Florey was created at the electoral redistribution of 1969 as a notionally safe Labor electorate, and was first contested at the 1970 election. Mostly it was safely held by the Labor party until the 1989 election when it became the minority Labor government's most marginal electorate. Florey was one of the first electorates to fall to the Liberals at the 1993 election landslide. It was regained by Labor's Frances Bedford at the 1997 election.

2018 election
Incumbent Frances Bedford resigned from Labor and became an independent on 28 March 2017 after Labor's Jack Snelling won Florey pre-selection for the 2018 election. As an independent, Bedford continued to provide confidence and supply support to the incumbent Labor government and did not make an immediate decision as to whether she would re-contest Florey as an independent. The 2016 electoral redistribution reassigned two-thirds of Playford voters to Florey. A ReachTEL poll conducted on 2 March 2017 of 606 voters in post-redistribution Florey indicated a 33.4 percent primary vote for Bedford running as an independent which would likely see Labor's Snelling defeated after preferences. Snelling announced on 17 September 2017 that he had decided not to contest the 2018 election. The 2018 election was subsequently won by Bedford which was the first time an independent candidate had won an election in the district since its inception.

Members for Florey

Election results

See also
 1982 Florey state by-election

Notes

References
 ECSA profile for Florey: 2018
 ABC profile for Florey: 2018
 Poll Bludger profile for Florey: 2018

1970 establishments in Australia
Electoral districts of South Australia